William Henry Irwin (14 October 1884 – 17 October 1946) was an Australian rules footballer who played with Melbourne in the Victorian Football League (VFL).

Irwin played two games of football for Melbourne in 1911 and was also a keen cricketer. He enlisted in the artillery in World War I, subsequently becoming a chaplain. He later was a teacher at Trinity Grammar School, Victoria and St Peter's College, Adelaide.

Notes

External links 

1884 births
1946 deaths
Australian rules footballers from Victoria (Australia)
Melbourne Football Club players